Chilton Allan (April 6, 1786 – September 3, 1858) was a United States Representative from Kentucky.

Biography
He was born in Albemarle County, Virginia on April 6, 1786, before moving with his mother to Winchester, Kentucky in 1797. He attended the common schools, and also received private instructions. After this, he served an apprenticeship of three years as a wheelwright, studying law in his leisure time.  He was admitted to the bar in 1808 and commenced practice in Winchester, Kentucky. He owned slaves.

Allan was a member of the Kentucky House of Representatives in 1811, 1815, 1822, and 1830 and a member of the Kentucky Senate 1823–1827. He was elected as an Anti-Jacksonian to the Twenty-second and Twenty-third Congresses and reelected as a Whig to the Twenty-fourth Congress (March 4, 1831 – March 3, 1837). In Congress, he served as chairman, Committee on Territories (Twenty-third Congress) but was not a candidate for renomination in 1836.

After leaving Congress, he was appointed president of the Kentucky board of internal improvements in 1837 and served until 1839, when he resigned. He resumed the practice of law and was again a member of the Kentucky House of Representatives in 1842. He died in Winchester, Kentucky on September 3, 1858 and was buried in Winchester Cemetery.

Notes

Sources
 
 

1786 births
1858 deaths
People from Albemarle County, Virginia
National Republican Party members of the United States House of Representatives from Kentucky
Whig Party members of the United States House of Representatives from Kentucky
Members of the Kentucky House of Representatives
Kentucky lawyers
American slave owners
People from Winchester, Kentucky